Time-Slip is a novel by Graham Dunstan Martin published in 1986.

Plot summary
Time-Slip is a novel in which a new Messiah appears in a post-holocaust Scotland.

Reception
Dave Langford reviewed Time-Slip for White Dwarf #78, and stated that "Martin makes it blackly clear that his protagonist's religious cure-all leads to an upswing in the evil it explains away."

Reviews
Review by Brian Stableford (1986) in Fantasy Review, May 1986
Review by Mark Greener (1986) in Vector 133

References

1986 British novels
Allen & Unwin books
British post-apocalyptic novels
Novels about religion
Novels set in Scotland